Frank Rinck (born 4 November 1986) is a German politician for the AfD and since 2021 member of the Bundestag, the federal diet.

Life and politics 

Rinck was born 1986 in the West German town of Stade and entered the AfD in 2015.

Rinck was elected to the Bundestag in 2021.

References 

Living people
1986 births
Alternative for Germany politicians
Members of the Bundestag 2021–2025
21st-century German politicians